Oedebasis ovipennis is a moth of the family Noctuidae. It is known from Mozambique, Seychelles and Réunion.

Male: Head, thorax and abdomen are reddish brown mixed with black, forewings pale red brown irrorated (speckled) with black. Hindwings pale fuscous brown.

Female: Vertex of thorax white, abdomen whitish.

Their wingspan is 30 mm.

References

Moths described in 1902
Calpinae
Lepidoptera of Mozambique
Moths of Réunion
Moths of Sub-Saharan Africa
Insects of Seychelles